"Get Together", also known as "Let's Get Together" and "Everybody Get Together", is a song by American rock band the Youngbloods, originally included in their 1967 debut album The Youngbloods. It was written in the mid-1960s by American singer-songwriter Chet Powers (stage name Dino Valenti), from psychedelic rock band Quicksilver Messenger Service. The single was The Youngbloods' only Top 40 on Billboard Hot 100peaking at number five in 1969.

Background
The song is an appeal for peace and brotherhood, presenting the polarity of love versus fear, and the choice to be made between them. It is best remembered for the impassioned plea in the lines of its refrain ("Come on people now/Smile on your brother/Everybody get together/Try to love one another right now"), which is repeated several times in succession to bring the song to its conclusion.

Original recording history
The song was originally recorded as "Let's Get Together" by the Kingston Trio in a live performance in March 1964 that was released on June 1, 1964, on their album Back in Town. While it was not released as a single, this version was the first to bring the song to the attention of the general public. The Kingston Trio often performed it live.

Cover versions
A version of the song first broke into the top forty in 1965, when We Five, produced by Kingston Trio manager Frank Werber, released "Let's Get Together" as the follow-up to their top ten hit "You Were on My Mind". While it did not achieve the same level of success as the other, "Let's Get Together" provided the group with a second top 40 hit on the Billboard Hot 100 when it peaked at number 31 and number 5 in Canada. It would be their last hit record. This was included on their second album, Make Someone Happy.
 Jefferson Airplane included a version on its 1966 debut album,  Jefferson Airplane Takes Off.
The most notable recording came in 1967, when the Youngbloods released their version of the song under the title "Get Together". It became a minor Hot 100 hit for them, peaking at number 62 and reaching 37 on the US adult contemporary chart. However, renewed interest in the Youngbloods' version came when it was used in a radio public service announcement as a call for brotherhood by the National Conference of Christians and Jews. The Youngbloods' version, the most-remembered today, was re-released in 1969, peaking at number 5 on the Billboard Hot 100.
In 1968, The Sunshine Company recorded a version of the song, under the title "Let's Get Together".
Also in 1968, the Canadian group 3's a Crowd released their version of the song as a single, titled "Let's Get Together".  It peaked at number 70 on Canada's national singles chart.
In 1969, Richie Havens played "Get Together" live at the Woodstock festival.
In 1970, Gwen and Jerry Collins released a version of the song as a single that reached number 34 on the US country chart.
In March 1970, the Dave Clark Five reached number 8 on the UK Singles Chart with their version retitled "Everybody Get Together".
In 1974, Aliotta Haynes Jeremiah performed the song on PBS station WTTW Channel 11, for the series "Made in Chicago."
In 1995, Big Mountain released a version of the song as a single that reached number 28 on the US adult contemporary chart and number 44 on the Billboard Hot 100. It also reached number 32 on Cash Box.
In 1991, Nirvana included the chorus lyrics - "Come on people now, smile on your brother. Everybody get together, try to love one another right now" - in the introduction to "Territorial Pissings" on the album Nevermind. "Sung" in a garbled manner by Krist Novoselic, Kurt Cobain explained their inclusion to Brazilian publication O Globo: "The song speaks of people who join together to be cool and try something new, the ideal contrast to the macho men I'm portraying in 'Territorial Pissings.' We didn't mean to be offensive to the guy who wrote it. The idea of being positive and causing change in society and the world was appropriated by media, who turned it into something ridiculous, a caricature."
In 2021, Belinda Carlisle released a version of the song to be included on a Record Store Day-exclusive EP titled Nobody Owns Me.

Chart history

Weekly charts
The Youngbloods

The Dave Clark Five

Year-end charts

Legacy
Following the September 11 terrorist attacks, the media conglomerate company Clear Channel Communications included the Youngbloods' version of the song on a list of "lyrically questionable" songs that was sent to its 1,200 radio stations in the United States.

See also
 List of 1960s one-hit wonders in the United States

References

External links
Get Together at Songfacts.com
1963 release by The Folkswingers
Beyond the Summer of Love, 'Get Together' Is An Anthem For Every Season, NPR, April 10, 2019

Peace songs
1963 songs
1965 singles
1967 singles
1968 singles
1969 singles
1970 singles
1995 singles
The Kingston Trio songs
We Five songs
The Youngbloods songs
The Dave Clark Five songs
Jefferson Airplane songs
Song recordings produced by Felix Pappalardi
Anti-war songs
A&M Records singles
RCA Victor singles
Imperial Records singles
Songs written by Chet Powers